The White Rock Tritons are a high school baseball team located in South Surrey area of the City of Surrey, British Columbia, British Columbia.  Although most of the Tritons players are from the White Rock and South Surrey communities, the team also attracts talent from other areas around the Lower Mainland such as Delta, Ladner and the rest of Surrey, as well as attracting high school players from Blaine, Washington.

Newly appointed coach is Kyle Dhanani, former draft pick from Thompson University.

Former coaches include Russ Smithson. Smithson is a Canadian Jr National Team graduate, and spent his college career on scholarship to El Paso CC in Texas, and the University of Kentucky.

The team was founded in 1993, and joined the B.C. Premier Baseball League in 1999.  The team plays their home games at South Surrey Athletic Park.

The Tritons have sent on 78 players to college baseball, as well as 13 players signed to MLB teams, and compete in the top tournaments in Canada and the US.

The most notable Tritons alumni include pitcher Leon Boyd (signed by Toronto Blue Jays in 2009, World Baseball Classic for the Netherlands 2009) and Mitch Hodge (drafted by the Kansas City Royals in 2007).

References

External links
 Official Website
 Team History
 White Rock Tritons page on BCPBL website

Baseball teams in British Columbia
Amateur baseball teams in Canada
Baseball teams established in 1999
1999 establishments in British Columbia